Actias neidhoeferi is a moth of the family Saturniidae. It is found in Taiwan.

Ong Sheng-keng and Yu Ching-kin were the first Taiwanese researchers to publish a journal article on Lepidoptera when they described Actias neidhoeferi as a new species.

References

Moths described in 1968
Neidhoeferi
Moths of Taiwan